West Anchorage High School (formerly Anchorage High School) is a public high school in Anchorage, Alaska. The school is part of the Anchorage School District (ASD). Opened in 1953, West is the oldest of ASD's eight major high schools. Serving the western parts of downtown and midtown Anchorage, in 2020-2021 it had an enrollment of 1,754.This makes West Anchorage High School the high school with the highest student enrollment in Alaska, edging East Anchorage High School out by 44 students, which enrolled 1,710 students.

History
The school was established as Anchorage High School in 1953, during a boom period in Anchorage. Anchorage had gone from having one school, to having to hold classes in World War II-surplus Quonset huts, in less than a decade due to the rapid population influx to Anchorage, which was centered upon WWII, the Cold War and related construction activity at Elmendorf Air Force Base and Fort Richardson. The Anchorage Independent School District (AISD), which consolidated the incorporated area of Anchorage with adjacent outlying areas for the purpose of providing education services, was formed in 1947 in response to this boom and the strain it placed upon public services, particularly education. A period of heightened school construction in the Anchorage area would follow throughout the 1950s.

The school was built in a part of Anchorage known as Romig Hill, in the northwest corner of what became Spenard. Just five years before the school's construction, this area was largely rural, populated by cabins and farms. The nearby KENI Radio Building constructed by Austin E. Lathrop was the only substantial construction in the area until the Spenard Public Utility District (PUD) was formed. Public utility districts, like independent school districts, were devised by the territorial legislature to address systemic problems inherent in municipal government at the time, which hampered providing services to growing communities. The school itself was not within the corporate limits of Anchorage at the time of its construction (those limits ended at 16th Avenue, the southern limit of the original townsite reserve), but would later be annexed by Anchorage. Following the Spenard PUD's formation, the area immediately surrounding the school saw a building boom, largely due to the efforts of real estate developers such as Earl 
and Wally Hickel.

The year after the school opened, Anchorage Community College (ACC), the lineal predecessor of the University of Alaska Anchorage, began holding classes in the building as well. ACC continued to use the building until they moved to the campus built in the Goose Lake neighborhood (an area now known as the University-Medical District, or U-Med for short) in the early 1970s. The school's name would change from Anchorage High School to West Anchorage High School following the opening of East Anchorage High School in 1961. AISD headquarters were located adjacent to the school, at what was (at the time) the northern end of Minnesota Drive. This building is currently home to the data processing facility of ASD.

Building
West Anchorage High School is adjacent to Romig Middle School and is connected to Romig by a hallway. The schools share a library and running track, the former of which was designed and built as a joint library for both schools. The school's original library, known in later years as "The Cove", has served primarily as classroom space in the years since. The school's gifted and talented programs were held in this part of the school for many years.

The Good Friday earthquake of March 27, 1964 destroyed most of the school's second floor, as well as damaging the first floor. Currently, the band/orchestra and choir rooms are all that is left of the second floor. The destruction was a determining factor in the design of Dimond High School and Chugiak High School, both of which were built in the years immediately following the earthquake.

The school's science wing was added in 1996 with an indoor planetarium and eight science classrooms with attached labs. A major renovation to the school in 1998 added a new hallway, classrooms, a pool and additional lockers.

Auditorium and gymnasium
West High is also home to a 2,000 seat auditorium, the largest of any high school in Alaska. From the time of its construction in 1954 until 1984, it was the largest meeting space in the city.

The auditorium hosted many events and concerts including Steppenwolf, the Paul Taylor Dance Company, A Prairie Home Companion (1986), Ozzy Osbourne, Blue Öyster Cult (the first of many appearances the band made in Alaska between 1980 and 1999), Bee Gees, Ted Nugent, Nazareth (1983), Ray Charles, Johnny Cash and Itzhak Perlman, and Bill Nye the science guy (2014). The Grateful Dead held their only Alaska concerts in the auditorium over the summer solstice, on June 19 through 21, 1980. In 2008, renovations were completed that refurbished the entirety of the auditorium.

The gym seats up to 4,500 people for events which accommodate floor seating. Professional wrestling matches, usually booked and headlined by Sándor Szabó and featuring other wrestling talent based in Southern California, were a staple of the Fur Rendezvous Festival from the mid 1950s through the early 1960s. The wrestling card on February 20, 1959, an impromptu event stemming from a televised angle earlier in the week and which saw Szabó and Count Billy Varga defeat Lord James Blears and Mr. Moto, drew the largest indoor paid attendance of any event in Alaska's history to that point.

A worship rally held in the gym in 1978, organized by the East Anchorage-based Anchorage Baptist Temple and headlined by keynote speaker Paul Harvey, raised the public profile of the church substantially. The church's pastor, Jerry Prevo, was largely unknown at the time outside of the sphere of influence of his congregation. Prevo and his parishioners would become well known in Anchorage shortly thereafter for their role in establishing the Moral Majority in Alaska and their active involvement in Republican Party politics.

Until the construction of the Sullivan Arena and the Egan Center, under what Anchorage titled "Project 80s," the West High auditorium and gymnasium were the primary venues in Anchorage for many concerts and other similar events. The only other venues in Anchorage which could accommodate sizable crowds were the Anchorage Sports Arena, a large Quonset hut-type structure at the corner of Fireweed Lane and A Street (which has housed retail businesses since 1980), and the Buckner Fieldhouse on Fort Richardson (now part of Joint Base Elmendorf-Richardson). Following the opening of the Sullivan Arena and the Egan Center, ASD largely stopped renting the venues to commercial promoters. Many events (including concerts) associated with fundraising for nonprofit organizations continue to be held at the school, however.

Eagle emblem
The original 1953 floor tile bearing the school's seal (eagle logo and name) is kept well-preserved, and encircled by a chain barrier. The eagle on the front of the auditorium was presented to the school by the class of 1971.

Renovations
In 2008, the Alaska Legislature appropriated $900,000 to create a master plan for redeveloping West Anchorage High School and Romig Middle School as 21st century schools in a center of community.

Both West and Romig's Parent Teacher Student Associations, and the eight Anchorage community councils within the attendance area of the schools, have supported redeveloping the campus consistent with the Pre-Planning Vision Report completed in the spring of 2008.

The planning process moved forward in November 2008 with a community wide effort to define the 21st-century educational programs for West and Romig as well as to design the campus as a center of community. Meetings were scheduled over the next year, seeking input from the schools, teachers, parents, students, the municipality, businesses, non-profit agencies, and community as a whole. The planning process was scheduled to be completed in December 2009 with sufficient detail to design, finance, and redevelop both schools to meet the educational needs of the 21st century and become a center of community.

In the latter half of the 2010's, a two story medical wing was added, allowing classes such as First Aid and Health Occupation Essentials to be added to the curriculum. This would be the first time part of the second floor would be added to the school since the 1964 Good Friday earthquake, albeit neither section of the second floor is directly connected to each other.

Academics
West High is attended by approximately 2,000 students in grades 9-12, instructed by roughly 125 faculty. Its mascot is the eagle and its colors are orange and black. Class colors are yellow (freshmen) and alternate to blue, red, and green for three consecutive years after students reach their sophomore year.

International Baccalaureate
West High has been an International Baccalaureate World School since February 2004, students complete IB classes in six subject areas. and is currently the only high school in the Anchorage School District with an International Baccalaureate program. 13 students graduated from the program in May 2008.

School Through the Arts
West is also home to the School Through the Arts program, which integrates the study of arts into high school courses. Freshmen take STTA history and English classes, as well as an STTA art studio course. Sophomores take the STTA history and English courses, and other non-STTA arts classes. Juniors and seniors continue taking arts classes but take their history and English classes in the normal school program.

Extracurricular activities

Publications
The school newspaper, the Eagle's Cry, is an online publication with content made by students in journalism classes. The school's creative writing magazine is the Eagle's Quill.

Yearbook
The school's yearbook is The Anchor.

Drama, Debate, and Forensics
West's competitive Drama, Debate, and Forensics team competes in the Alaska School Activities Association's state championship 4A division.

Theatre
West's theatre program was accepted as a representative of the American High School Theatre Festival at the Edinburgh Festival Fringe in August 2007, where they performed Moby Dick! The Musical. West was the first high school from the state of Alaska nominated to attend the festival. The theatre program was invited to perform in the festival a total of four times (the most of any Alaskan school), most recently in 2010, performing "Seussical: The Musical."

Olympiada of Spoken Russian
Russian language students at West High traditionally compete in the National Competition of Spoken Russian. Students participate from first year through fourth year as students of Russian language. Native speakers of Russian also compete in their own division.

Notable alumni

(includes alumni of Anchorage High School prior to the construction of West)
 Ty Conklin (1976–), NHL goaltender, Detroit Red Wings
 Eric Croft (1964–), class of 1982, attorney and Democratic politician
 David Cuddy (1952–), class of 1970, retired banker, businessman and Republican politician
 Mike Doogan (1948–), class of 1966, writer, former columnist for the Anchorage Daily News, retired member of the Alaska House of Representatives
 Greg Fisk (1945–2015), class of 1963, former Mayor of Juneau, Alaska
 James Gottstein, class of 1971, attorney involved in psychiatry issues; member of a prominent pioneer Anchorage family
 George A. Lingo (1901–1976), attended Anchorage High School in its earliest years, graduated from Lincoln High School in Seattle; businessman, politician and government official in territorial days
 William Oefelein (1965–), former NASA astronaut; flew as pilot of the STS-116 space shuttle mission
 Paul O'Neill (1935–2020), class of 1954, 72nd United States Secretary of the Treasury
 Don Simpson (1943–1996), Hollywood film producer
 Bill Stolt (1900–2001), class of 1920, mayor of Anchorage from 1941 to 1944, Anchorage businessman for many decades (most prominently as the owner of Stolt's Home Center)
 Dan Sullivan (1951–), class of 1969, Mayor of Anchorage, 2009–2015
 Kristen Thorsness (1960–), class of 1978, 1984 Los Angeles Olympic gold medalist in women's coxed eights crew

See also
 List of high schools in Alaska

External links

References

1953 establishments in Alaska
Anchorage School District
High schools in Anchorage, Alaska
International Baccalaureate schools in Alaska
Music venues in Alaska
Public high schools in Alaska